XECTZ-AM (La Voz de la Sierra Norte – "The Voice of the Sierra Norte") is an indigenous community radio station that broadcasts in Spanish, Nahuatl and Totonac from Cuetzalan, in the Sierra Norte region of the Mexican state of Puebla. 
It is run by the Cultural Indigenist Broadcasting System (SRCI) of the National Commission for the Development of Indigenous Peoples (CDI).

External links
XECTZ website

References

Nahuatl-language radio stations
Totonac-language radio stations
Radio stations in Puebla
Sistema de Radiodifusoras Culturales Indígenas
Radio stations established in 1994
Daytime-only radio stations in Mexico